Never a Dull Moment is a 1968 American heist comedy crime film from Walt Disney Productions starring Dick Van Dyke and Edward G. Robinson and directed by Jerry Paris. The script by A. J. Carothers was based The Reluctant Assassin by John Godey. The supporting cast features Dorothy Provine, Henry Silva, Slim Pickens and Jack Elam. Master cartoonist Floyd Gottfredson created a comic strip, Astro Pooch, to be used as a prop in the film.

It was re-released theatrically on April 15, 1977 on a double bill with a re-edited version of The Three Caballeros (1944) in featurette form.

Plot
Second-rate actor Jack Albany finds himself mistaken for fiendish killer Ace Williams and whisked off to master gangster Leo Smooth's fortified mansion. He is forced to continue with the charade, even when he finds he is to play a deadly role in the theft of the painting Field of Sunflowers, a 40 foot long masterpiece. Sally, an art teacher, is a potential ally for Jack.

Further complications ensue when the real Ace Williams shows up, making it even more difficult for Albany to keep up his false identity. Eventually, Albany outwits the gangsters and foils the robbery.

Cast
 Dick Van Dyke as Jack Albany
 Edward G. Robinson as Leo Joseph Smooth
 Dorothy Provine as Sally Inwood
 Henry Silva as Frank Boley
 Joanna Cook Moore as Melanie Smooth
 Tony Bill as Florian
 Slim Pickens as Cowboy Schaeffer
 Jack Elam as Ace Williams
 Ned Glass as Rinzy Tobreski
 Richard Bakalyan as Bobby Macoon
 Mickey Shaughnessy as Francis
 Philip Coolidge as Fingers Felton
 James Millhollin as Museum Director
 Eleanor Audley as Society Matron

Reception
Howard Thompson of The New York Times gave Never a Dull Moment a largely negative review, calling it "good-natured" but claiming that "most of it seems mighty strenuous and over-worked." Thompson saved most of his praise for the cartoon that accompanied the film, a reissue of Disney's Three Little Pigs from 1933. (This short also accompanied releases of The One and Only, Genuine, Original Family Band in some cities.) Arthur D. Murphy of Variety called it "a very amusing crime comedy" if "a bit long and talky." Charles Champlin of the Los Angeles Times declared it "the breeziest and most likeable Disney comedy in some time, with a verve and (relative) sophistication which can engage the favoring interest of the grown-ups as well as the moppets." Clifford Terry of the Chicago Tribune wrote, "The Disney studio comedy starts off amusingly enough, then loses its freshness after the first half hour. But the kids probably won't notice." The Monthly Film Bulletin stated, "With no pretensions to being anything but a rollicking farce, this slight but intermittently amusing comedy largely succeeds on its own modest level." The San Francisco Examiner'''s Jeanne Miller panned the film, writing that "all but the very young will probably take issue with the title of Never a Dull Moment, which opened yesterday at the Fox-Warfield. For things get very dull indeed in this uninspired, cliche-ridden spoof about a band of zany gangsters who plan the heist of a Manhattan art museum. Of course, the movie was designed by the Walt Disney Studio for the kiddies' summer vacation. But all the wacky misadventures must surely be familiar to the moppets who have seen them over and over again on their TV sets."

See also
 List of American films of 1968
 The Umbrella Coup'' (1980)

References

External links
 
 
 
 
 
 

1968 films
1960s crime comedy films
1960s heist films
1960s comedy mystery films
American crime comedy films
American heist films
American comedy mystery films
1960s English-language films
Films about actors
Films based on American novels
Films based on works by Morton Freedgood
Films directed by Jerry Paris
Films produced by Ron W. Miller
Films set in museums
Films set in New York City
Walt Disney Pictures films
1968 comedy films
1960s American films
English-language crime comedy films